Conway is an unincorporated community in southwestern Jackson Township, McPherson County, Kansas, United States.  It lies along U.S. Route 56 and a Kansas and Oklahoma Railroad line, west of the city of McPherson.

History

19th century
For millennia, the land now known as Kansas was inhabited by Native Americans.  In 1803, most of modern Kansas was secured by the United States as part of the Louisiana Purchase.  In 1854, the Kansas Territory was organized, then in 1861 Kansas became the 34th U.S. state.  In 1867, McPherson County was founded.

In 1878, Atchison, Topeka and Santa Fe Railway and parties from Marion County and McPherson County chartered the Marion and McPherson Railway Company.  In 1879, a branch line was built from Florence to McPherson, in 1880 it was extended to Lyons, in 1881 it was extended to Ellinwood.  The line was leased and operated by the Atchison, Topeka and Santa Fe Railway.  The line from Florence to Marion, was abandoned in 1968.  In 1992, the line from Marion to McPherson was sold to Central Kansas Railway. In 1993, after heavy flood damage, the line from Marion to McPherson was abandoned.  The original branch line connected Florence, Marion, Canada, Hillsboro, Lehigh, Canton, Galva, McPherson, Conway, Windom, Little River, Mitchell, Lyons, Chase, Ellinwood.

A post office was opened in Conway in 1880, and remained in operation until it was discontinued in 1983.

20th century
The National Old Trails Road, also known as the Ocean-to-Ocean Highway, was established in 1912, and was routed through Windom, Conway, McPherson.

Geography
Its elevation is 1,542 feet (470 m), and it is located at  (38.3694530, -97.7864348).

Economy
Conway is home to a large underground refined petroleum storage facility.  The storage facility consists of large caverns carved into the underlying salt beds.  The storage facility has a holding capacity of over 4 million barrels of propane and other refined petroleum products.  The Conway storage facility holds approximately 30% of the propane stored in the United States.

Education
The community is served by McPherson USD 418 public school district.

References

Further reading

External links
 Historic Images of Conway, Special Photo Collections at Wichita State University Library
 McPherson County maps: Current, Historic, KDOT

Unincorporated communities in McPherson County, Kansas
Unincorporated communities in Kansas
1880 establishments in Kansas
Populated places established in 1880